Calosima darwini is a moth in the family Blastobasidae. It is found on the Galapagos Islands.

The length of the forewings is 4-6.9 mm.

Etymology
The species is named after Charles Darwin.

References

Moths described in 1997
darwini